The Grammy Award for Best Score Soundtrack for Visual Media is an honor presented to a composer (or composers) for an original score created for a film, TV show or series, or other visual media at the Grammy Awards, a ceremony that was established in 1958 and originally called the Gramophone Awards. Honors in several categories are presented at the ceremony annually by The Recording Academy of the United States to "honor artistic achievement, technical proficiency and overall excellence in the recording industry, without regard to album sales or chart position".

It has been awarded since the 2nd Annual Grammy Awards in 1959. The first recipient was American composer and pianist Duke Ellington, for the soundtrack to the 1959 film Anatomy of a Murder. Originally known as the Grammy Award for Best Sound Track Album – Background Score from a Motion Picture or Television, the award is now known as the Grammy Award for Best Score Soundtrack for Visual Media. Until 2001, the award was presented to the composer of the music alone. From 2001 to 2007, the music producer(s) and sound engineer/mixer(s) shared the award. In 2007, the award reverted to a composer-only award. John Williams holds the record for most wins and nominations for the award, with eleven wins out of thirty-four nominations. Austin Wintory's nomination for Journey at the 55th Annual Grammy Awards was the only time that a video game was nominated in this category before the new category of Best Score Soundtrack For Video Games And Other Interactive Media was created in 2022.

As of 2023, the award's full title is Best Score Soundtrack for Visual Media (Includes Film and Television).

Recipients

Years reflect the year in which the Grammy Awards were presented, for works released in the previous year.

Name changes
There have been several minor changes to the name of the award:

Multiple wins and nominations
Up to and including the 65th Annual Grammy Awards (2023)

Wins
 John Williams – 11 (6 consecutive)
 Howard Shore – 3 (consecutive)
 Alexandre Desplat – 2
 Hildur Guðnadóttir – 2 (consecutive)
 Alan Menken – 2 (consecutive)
 Randy Newman – 2
 Thomas Newman – 2
 Trent Reznor – 2
 Atticus Ross – 2
 Hans Zimmer – 2
 Michael Giacchino – 2

Nominations
 John Williams – 34
 Hans Zimmer – 17
 Danny Elfman – 9
 Thomas Newman – 9

See also
 BAFTA Award for Best Original Music
 Academy Award for Best Original Score
 Critics' Choice Movie Award for Best Score
 Golden Globe Award for Best Original Score
 Grammy Award for Best Compilation Soundtrack for Visual Media
 Primetime Emmy Award for Outstanding Music Composition for a Series
 Primetime Emmy Award for Outstanding Music Composition for a Documentary Series or Special
 Primetime Emmy Award for Outstanding Music Composition for a Limited or Anthology Series, Movie or Special

Notes

References

General
  Note: User must select the "Film/TV/Media" category as the genre under the search feature.

Specific

External links
 Official site of the Grammy Awards

 
Film awards for best score
Score Soundtrack Album for Visual Media